Nélson Manuel Ribeiro da Silva (born 28 July 1979), known as Nelsinho, is a Portuguese professional footballer who plays as a midfielder.

Club career
Born in Felgueiras, Porto District, Nelsinho spent the better part of his career with Varzim S.C. since first arriving in 2008 from Gondomar SC. He went on to represent the club in both the second and third divisions, making 267 appearances in the former competition and retiring well in his 40s.

In late October 2018, 39-year-old Nelsinho suffered a knee injury during a league match against FC Porto B that sidelined him for two months. He returned to the lower leagues the following summer, joining Leça FC.

References

External links

1979 births
Living people
People from Felgueiras
Sportspeople from Porto District
Portuguese footballers
Association football midfielders
Liga Portugal 2 players
Segunda Divisão players
F.C. Vizela players
AD Fafe players
S.C. Braga players
S.C. Braga B players
C.F. Estrela da Amadora players
C.D. Trofense players
Gondomar S.C. players
Varzim S.C. players
G.D. Estoril Praia players
G.D. Ribeirão players
Leça F.C. players
S.C. Salgueiros players